Saudade traditionally is a Portuguese word, describing an emotion

Sudade may also refer to:
 Saudade (film), a 2011 Japanese film
 Saudade  (Moacir Santos album), 1974
 Saudade (Thievery Corporation album), 2014
 "Saudade" (Étienne Daho song), a 1994 song by Étienne Daho from his album La Notte, la notte
 "Saudade" (Porno Graffitti song), a 2000 song by Porno Graffitti
Saudades do Brasil, a 1920 piano composition by the French composer Darius Milhaud
 Saudade, a 2013 EP by indie pop singer-songwriter Tei Shi
 "Saudade", a 1994 song by Chris Rea from The Very Best of Chris Rea
 "Saudade", an instrumental by alternative rock band Love and Rockets
 A supergroup band, formed in 2016, consisting of Chino Moreno, Dr. Know, keyboardist John Medeski, bassist Chuck Doom, and drummer Mackie Jayson